The Ukrainian frigate Dnipropetrovsk was the former Soviet frigate (guard ship) Bezzavetnyy of the   (NATO codename: Krivak I) built for the Soviet Navy in the late 1970s.

Service history

Black Sea incident

On 12 February 1988, under the command of Captain 2nd Rank Vladimir Bogdashin, the ship intentionally  nudged the U.S. missile cruiser  in Soviet territorial waters while Yorktown was claiming innocent passage.

Ukrainian service
In summer of 1997 during the division of the Black Sea fleet she was transferred to the Ukrainian Navy, receiving the name of Dnipropetrovsk.

Fate
Dnipropetrovsk was decommissioned in 2002 and was scuttled in the Black Sea in the spring of 2005.

See also

References

Bibliography

External links
 

Krivak-class frigates of the Ukrainian Navy
1977 ships
Ships built at the Zalyv Shipbuilding yard
Maritime incidents in 1988
Ships built in the Soviet Union
Dnipro
Cold War frigates of the Soviet Union